Heinrich Ekkehard Fiechtner (born 29 September 1960 in Stuttgart-Bad Cannstatt) is a German hematologist and internal oncologist, palliative medicine specialist and politician (non-party, formerly AfD, CDU and FDP). From 2016 to 2021 he was a member of the state parliament of Baden-Württemberg for Alternative for Germany (AfD). He resigned from the party and parliamentary group at the end of November 2017, because he felt too much antisemitic sentiments in the party. He declares himself a supporter of Israel an Jews in Germany.  Fiechtner and AfD-MOP Wolfgang Gedeon, both doctors, exchanged certificates for exemption from the mask requirement in a video in 2020.

Fiechtner is a radical critic of public health measures against COVID, like mask mandates, tests, and lockdown. He declined the novel COVID vaccinations, and was a member of the international pressure group "World Doctors Alliance" that spread false and conspiratorial claims about COVID-19. Fiechtner was expelled from the Stuttgart State Parliament in 2021 by the police after rebuking members of the other parties for being responsible for a riot night in the center of Stuttgart. Later he partially won before the State Constitutional Court of Baden Wuerttemberg.

References

Living people
Politicians from Stuttgart
Alternative for Germany politicians
21st-century German politicians
Members of the Landtag of Baden-Württemberg
German hematologists
1960 births